The Quill and Dagger Society, founded at Cornell University in 1893, selects new undergraduate members in the spring of their junior year or fall of their senior year. A small number of honorary members have been selected since the society's founding, usually qualified individuals who were not eligible for membership as undergraduates, such as Janet Reno and Ruth Bader Ginsburg, both of whom graduated before the society accepted women. Cornell Presidents Dale R. Corson, Frank H.T. Rhodes, Hunter R. Rawlings III, and Jeffrey Lehman all hold membership in the society as well.

Membership is published in The Cornell Daily Sun each semester. Other sources of membership lists include The New York Times during the 1920s and 1930s, The Cornell Alumni News from 1899 to 1961, and The Cornellian yearbook. This list contains notable individuals who were selected for membership as undergraduates. Class years are listed in parentheses.

Arts, architecture, and entertainment
 James Kenneth Fraser (1897) – advertising pioneer; developed "Spotless Town" advertising campaign for Sapolio soap, considered one of the "100 Greatest Advertisements" in history; president of the Blackman Company
 Ernest A. Van Vleck (1897) – architect of Starrett & van Vleck known for New York City skyscrapers and retail buildings, including Lord & Taylor (1914), Saks Fifth Avenue (1924), Royal Insurance (1927), Abraham & Strauss (1929), American Stock Exchange (1930), Bloomingdales (1930), and the Downtown Athletic Club (1930); architect of Cornell University's Anabel Taylor Hall and Von Cramm Coop
 F. Ellis Jackson (1900) – Providence, Rhode Island architect; architect of Cornell University's Myron Taylor Hall
 Jay S. Fassett, Jr. (1911) – Broadway and film actor; played Doc Gibbs in the original production of Our Town; son of Congressman Jacob Sloat Fassett
Bruce Boyce (1933) – operatic baritone who performed with contemporaries Kathleen Ferrier and Suzanne Danco; Royal Academy of Music professor
Earl Flansburgh (1953) – Boston, Massachusetts architect and educational design expert; architect of the Cornell Campus Store; Cornell University trustee; father of John Flansburgh of They Might Be Giants and activist Paxus Calta
Thomas N. Armstrong III (1954) – Director of the Pennsylvania Academy of the Fine Arts (1971–1974), Whitney Museum of American Art (1974–1990), and Andy Warhol Museum (1993–1995)
Milt Kogan (1957) –  television and film actor best known for playing Officer Kogan on Barney Miller
Gene Case (1959) – advertising executive who developed campaigns for Mennen, Tums, Lyndon B. Johnson's 1964 presidential election, Nelson Rockefeller, and Robert F. Wagner
 Jay Harris (1960) – Tony Award-winning Broadway producer of Side Man, Dirty Rotten Scoundrels, and Never Gonna Dance; American Theatre Wing Board of Directors; father of Grammy Award winner Jesse Harris
 Kenneth S. Brecher (1967) – executive director of the Sundance Institute (1996–2009), owners of the Sundance Film Festival; Rhodes Scholar
 Ed Zuckerman (1970) – Emmy Award-winning producer and writer for Law & Order; creator of Century City; writer for episodes of Miami Vice, Star Trek: The Next Generation, and JAG
 Howard A. Rodman (1971) – President of the Writers Guild of America, West; professor at USC School of Cinematic Arts; screenwriter of Savage Grace and Joe Gould's Secret; Ordre des Arts et des Lettres
 Lon Hoyt (1979) – musical director and conductor of Broadway's The Rocky Horror Show and Tony Award-winning musical Hairspray
 Amanda Williams (1997) – Chicago-based visual artist and architect
 Sammus (2008) – rapper, songwriter, and producer

Athletics

Olympians
Lesley Ashburner (1906) – 1904 Summer Olympics bronze medalist in track and field (110 m. hurdles); consulting engineer for construction of The Pentagon
Herbert Trube (1908) – 1908 Summer Olympics silver medalist in track and field (3-mile team)
John Paul Jones (1913) – world record for one mile run (1911–1915); 1912 Summer Olympics participant; set first mile record to be ratified by the International Association of Athletics Federations (IAAF) (1913)
Francis Hunter (1916) – 1924 Summer Olympics gold medalist in tennis (doubles); International Tennis Hall of Fame
Frank Foss (1917) – 1920 Summer Olympics gold medalist in track and field (pole vault); world record for pole vault (1919–1922)
Alma Richards (1917) – 1912 Summer Olympics gold medalist in track and field (high jump)
John Anderson (1929) – 1932 Summer Olympics gold medalist in track and field (discus throw)
Charles H. Moore (1951) – 1952 Summer Olympics gold medalist in track and field (400 m. hurdles) and silver medalist in track and field (4 × 100 m. relay); one of the first hurdlers to use 13 instead of 15 steps; Cornell University Director of Athletics (1994–1999); National Track & Field Hall of Fame
Meredith Gourdine (1952) – 1952 Summer Olympics silver medalist in track and field (long jump); engineer and physicist with 70 patents; electrogasdynamics pioneer; Cornell University trustee
Albert W. Hall (1956) – four-time Summer Olympics hammer throw participant (1956, 1960, 1964, 1968) with fourth-place finish in 1956
David Auble (1960) – two-time NCAA Wrestling Champion (1959, 1960); two-time All-American (1959, 1960); 1964 Summer Olympics wrestling team; National Wrestling Hall of Fame
Ron Maierhofer (1960) – U.S. National Soccer team (1959–1960); 1960 Summer Olympics soccer team; owner of the Denver Avalanche
Donald Spero (1961) – World Rowing Single Sculls Champion (1966); U.S. National Champion in Single Sculls (1963, 1964, 1966), Double Sculls (1963), and Quadruple Sculls (1965); sixth place in 1964 Summer Olympics; co-founder of National Rowing Foundation; National Rowing Hall of Fame; International Jewish Sports Hall of Fame
David Clark (1982) – 1984 Summer Olympics silver medalist in rowing (coxless four); 1981 World Rowing Championship bronze medalist
Ben Scrivens (2010) – NHL Maple Leafs organization (2010–2013); Los Angeles Kings organization (2013); Edmonton Oilers organization (2013-2015); Montreal Canadiens organization (2016); 2018 Winter Olympics bronze medalist
Rebecca Johnston (2012) – 2010 and 2014 Winter Olympics gold medalist and 2018 Winter Olympics silver medalist with Canada women's national ice hockey team; 2008 & 2009 IIHF World Women's Championships silver medalist
Kyle Dake (2013) – four-time NCAA Wrestling Champion (2010, 2011, 2012, 2013); only wrestler to ever win four NCAA titles in four different weight classes
Lauriane Rougeau (2013) – 2014 Winter Olympics gold medalist and 2018 Winter Olympics silver medalist with Canada women's national ice hockey team; gold medal in 2012 IIHF Women's World Championship; scored game-winning goal with 10 seconds left in third overtime of 2012 NCAA quarterfinal and longest game in Cornell University history, featured on ESPN's SportsCenter
Brianne Jenner (2014) –  2014 Winter Olympics gold medalist and 2018 Winter Olympics silver medalist with Canada women's national ice hockey team; gold medal in 2012 IIHF Women's World Championship & 2010 Four Nations Cup
Stephen Mozia (2015) – Nigerian record holder for indoor and outdoor shot put; 2016 Summer Olympics athlete
Jillian Saulnier (2015) – Canada women's national ice hockey team; silver medalist in 2015 IIHF Women's World Championship and 2018 Winter Olympics
Rudy Winkler (2017) – 2016 U.S. Olympic Trials hammer throw champion; 2016 Summer Olympics hammer throw participant
Taylor Knibb (2020) – 2020 Summer Olympics silver medalist in triathlon mixed relay

Professional athletes
Edmund "Stubby" Magner (1911) – MLB American League New York Highlanders (1911)
Harry "Dutch" Schirick (1914) – MLB American League St. Louis Browns (1914)
Fred Gillies (1918) – APFA and NFL Chicago Cardinals (1920–1926, 1928)
Harold "Hal" Ebersole (1923) – NFL Cleveland Indians (1923)
Reno Jones (1923) – NFL Toledo Maroons (1922)
Johnny Ferraro (1934) – CFL Hamilton Tigers player and coach (1934–1935); Canadian Football Hall of Fame
Harold F. Nunn (1936) – AFL Boston Shamrocks (1936)
Tommy Rich (1938) – National Basketball League Rochester Royals (1945–1946)
Harold "Hal" McCullough (1941) – NFL Brooklyn Dodgers (1942)
Ken Stofer (1943) – AAFC Buffalo Bisons (1946)
Al Dekdebrun (1947) – AAFC Buffalo Bisons (1946), Chicago Rockets (1947), and New York Yankees (1948); NFL Boston Yanks (1948); CFL Toronto Argonauts (1950–1951)

Ken Dryden (1969) – NHL Montreal Canadiens goalie (1970–1979); six-time Stanley Cup winner; five-time Vezina Trophy winner; Conn Smythe Trophy winner; Hockey Hall of Fame; author of The Game; Canadian Minister of Social Development (2004–2006); member of the Parliament of Canada (2004–2011)
Larry Fullan (1972) – NHL Washington Capitals (1974–1975)
Bruce Arena (1973) – coach of the United States men's national soccer team (1998–2006, 2016–2017); Major League Soccer coach of D.C. United (1996–1998), New York Red Bulls (2006–2007), and Los Angeles Galaxy (2008–2016); National Soccer Hall of Fame
Kip Jordan (1974) – North American Soccer League Miami Toros (1974–1975) and Rochester Lancers (1976)
Bob Lally (1974) – NFL Green Bay Packers (1976)
Ken Talton (1979) – NFL Kansas City Chiefs (1980) and USFL Birmingham Stallions (1983–1984)
Brock Tredway (1981) – NHL Los Angeles Kings (1981–1982)
Derrick Harmon (1984) – NFL San Francisco 49ers (1984–1986); Super Bowl XIX champion
David Kozier (2002) – EPIHL Isle of Wight Raiders (2002–2003), EIHL Manchester Phoenix (2003–2004)
Stephen Baby (2003) – NHL Atlanta Thrashers organization (2003–2007)
Ryan Vesce (2004) – NHL San Jose Sharks organization (2008–2010); KHL Torpedo Nizhny Novgorod (2010–2012); co-founder of Salmon Cove clothing brand
Kevin Boothe (2006) – NFL Oakland Raiders (2006, 2014) and New York Giants (2007–2013); Super Bowl XLII champion; Super Bowl XLVI champion
Matt Moulson (2006) – NHL Los Angeles Kings (2006–2008); New York Islanders (2009–2013); Buffalo Sabres (2013–2018)
Byron Bitz (2007) – NHL Boston Bruins organization (2007–2010); Florida Panthers organization (2010–2011); Vancouver Canucks organization (2011–2012)
David McKee (2007) – NHL Anaheim Ducks organization (2006–2008); AHL, CHL, and ECHL ice hockey player
Raymond Sawada (2008) – NHL Dallas Stars organization (2008–2012); Asia League Ice Hockey Oji Eagles (2015–2016)
Colin Greening (2010) – NHL Ottawa Senators organization (2010–2016); Toronto Maple Leafs organization (2016–2019)
Ryan Wittman (2010) – Fulgor Libertas Forli (2010–2011); NBA Summer League and Orlando Summer League (2010); Fort Wayne Mad Ants (2011-2012); son of Randy Wittman
Morgan Barron (2021) – NHL New York Rangers organization

Other
Henry Schoellkopf (1902) – Cornell University head football coach (1907–1908); namesake of Schoellkopf Memorial Hall
Charles A. Lueder (1903) – National Rowing Hall of Fame; Cornell University crew coach (1924–1926), head football coach at Virginia Tech (1903) and West Virginia University (1908–1911)
Sanford Hunt (1904) – All-American football player; long-time national record holder for longest run with a recovered fumble (105 yards)
James Lynah (1905) – principal founder of the Eastern Intercollegiate Athletic Conference (now the ECAC); strong proponent of a firmer Ivy League for athletics; Cornell University Director of Athletics (1935–1944); namesake of Cornell University's Lynah Rink; namesake of the ECAC Distinguished Achievement Award
William Newman (1907) – 1906 College Football All-America Team; Intercollegiate Rowing Association champion; Georgetown Hoyas head football coach (1909)
Howard B. Ortner (1918) – President of the National Association of Basketball Coaches (1935)
Fritz Shiverick (1918) – All-American football quarterback on the undefeated national champion 1915 Cornell team
Glenn D. Stafford (1929) – NCAA Wrestling Champion (1929); All-American (1929)
Charles F. Berman (1948) – namesake of Charles F. Berman Field
Carl F. Ullrich (1950) – first executive director of the Patriot League; first civilian director of athletics at the United States Military Academy(1980–1990); collegiate rowing coach
Frank A. Bettucci (1953) – NCAA Wrestling Champion (1953); All-American (1953); National Wrestling Hall of Fame
Clayton W. Chapman (1957) – 1957 Henley Royal Regatta Grand Challenge Cup winner; ECAC Commissioner and Regatta Director; namesake of U.S. Rowing Administrator Award and ECAC Most Improved trophy; National Rowing Hall of Fame
George F. Ford, Jr. (1957) – 1957 Henley Royal Regatta Grand Challenge Cup winner; National Rowing Hall of Fame
Philip T. Gravink (1957) – 1957 Henley Royal Regatta Grand Challenge Cup winner; National Rowing Hall of Fame
William J. Schumacher (1957) – 1957 Henley Royal Regatta Grand Challenge Cup winner; National Rowing Hall of Fame
Carl W. Schwarz (1957) – 1957 Henley Royal Regatta Grand Challenge Cup winner; National Rowing Hall of Fame
Laing E. Kennedy (1963) – Cornell University Athletic Director (1983–1994); Kent State University Athletic Director (1994–2010)
Bruce L. Cohen (1965) – gold medal with U.S. national team in World Lacrosse Championship (1974); National Lacrosse Hall of Fame
Milton E. "Butch" Hilliard (1968) – Ensign C. Markland Kelly, Jr. Award (1967, 1968); National Lacrosse Hall of Fame
Bob J. Rule (1971) – Ensign C. Markland Kelly, Jr. Award (1971); NCAA Ice Hockey Championship team (1970); NCAA Lacrosse Championship team (1971); gold medal with U.S. national team in World Lacrosse Championship (1974); National Lacrosse Hall of Fame; only Cornellian to win two national championships in two different sports
Daniel R. Mackesey (1977) – Ensign C. Markland Kelly, Jr. Award (1976, 1977); NCAA Lacrosse Championship team (1976, 1977); NCAA Top Five Award (first Ivy League recipient); silver medal with U.S. national team in World Lacrosse Championship (1978); National Lacrosse Hall of Fame
Robert L. Henrickson (1978) – NCAA Lacrosse Championship team (1976, 1977); National Lacrosse Hall of Fame
Jeremy Schaap (1991) – Emmy Award-winning sportswriter and broadcaster; son of Dick Schaap
Mark Tatum (1991) – Deputy Commissioner of the National Basketball Association
Tracey DeKeyser (1997) – Wisconsin Badgers women's ice hockey team assistant coach
Max King (2002) – ultra-marathon runner; winner of 2011 World Mountain Running Championships, 2014 IAU 100 km World Championships, and 2014 Warrior Dash World Championships
Travis Lee (2005) – two-time NCAA Wrestling Champion (2003, 2005); four-time All-American (2002, 2003, 2004, 2005)
Troy Nickerson (2010) – NCAA Wrestling Champion (2009); four-time All-American (2006, 2007, 2009, 2010)
Cam Simaz (2012) – NCAA Wrestling Champion (2012); four-time All-American (2009–2012); Association of Career Wrestlers inaugural champion
Nahshon Garrett (2016) – NCAA Wrestling Champion (2016); four-time All-American (2013–2016)
Cassandra Poudrier (2016) – Canada women's national ice hockey development team; gold medal in 2015 Nations Cup
Yianni Diakomihalis (2023) – 4x NCAA Wrestling Champion (2018, 2019, 2022, 2023); 2022 World Wrestling Championships silver medalist; 2020 Pan American champion

Authors and journalists

Pulitzer Prize winners
Kenneth Roberts (1908) – 1957 Pulitzer Prize special award and citation for historical novels; author of Northwest Passage
E. B. White (1921) – 1978 Pulitzer Prize special award and citation for letters, essays, and other works; author of Charlotte's Web, Stuart Little, and The Elements of Style
 Robert Kessler (1965) – 1997 Pulitzer Prize-winning journalist with Newsday
 Eric Freedman (1971) – 1994 Pulitzer Prize-winning journalist with The Detroit News
 Jay Branegan (1972) – 1976 Pulitzer Prize-winning journalist with The Chicago Tribune
 Marc Lacey (1987) – 1993 Pulitzer Prize-winning journalist with The Los Angeles Times; The New York Times deputy foreign editor
 John Hassell (1991) – 2005 Pulitzer Prize-winning journalist with The Star-Ledger

Other
Earl W. Mayo (1894) – founder and editor of World Petroleum magazine
Charles C. Whinery (1899) – American editor of the Encyclopædia Britannica Eleventh Edition; editor of the New International Encyclopedia; one of the founding editors of the Cornell Alumni News
George Jean Nathan (1904) – drama critic; founder of American Spectator and The American Mercury
Maximilian Elser Jr. (1910) – founded the Metropolitan Newspaper Service, sold to United Features in 1930, which syndicated writers like Gertrude Atherton, Joseph Conrad, and Booth Tarkington, and the Tarzan comic strip
F. Dana Burnet (1911) – poet, short story author, and Broadway playwright; author of many plays adapted into films
Charles Divine (1911) – poet, Broadway playwright; film writer
Mario Lazo (1915) – lawyer; expert on American policy in Cuban; fought for freedom of the Cuban press; author of Dagger in the Heart: American Policy Failures in Cuba
Gustave S. Lobrano (1924) – Mmnaging editor of The New Yorker (1941–1956)
Hugh Troy (1926) – world-renowned prankster and children's book author
Austin H. Kiplinger (1939) – editor and executive of the Kiplinger publishing empire, including Kiplinger's Personal Finance; Cornell University Board of Trustees Chairman (1984–1989); Cornell University presidential councilor
Clinton Rossiter (1939) – government professor, historian, political scientist, and author of The American Presidency
Stuart Loory (1954) – executive producer (1987–1990) and vice-president (1990–1995) of CNN; editor-in-chief of CNN World Report (1990–1991); managing editor of Chicago Sun-Times; included on Richard Nixon's list of political opponents
Ross D. Wetzsteon (1954) – theater editor (and briefly editor-in-chief) for The Village Voice; chairman, host, and driving force behind the Obie Awards
Ken Blanchard (1961) – management and leadership consultant; author and developer of the One Minute Manager concept; Cornell Entrepreneur of the Year (1991); Cornell University trustee
Danny Schechter (1964) – the "News Dissector;" Emmy Award-winning television producer, filmmaker, blogger, and media critic
Alfred Gingold (1968) – freelance writer and humor author
Sam Roberts (1968) – deputy editor of The New York Times Week in Review (1995–2015); inaugural author of the "Metro Matters" column; columnist, reporter, and editor with The New York Times and New York Daily News; biographer of David Greenglass and Nelson Rockefeller
Stanley Chess (1969) – legal commentator; founder of Legal America, Inc., which operates multiple law-related websites; editor-in-chief of The Cornell Daily Sun leading up to the controversial 1969 Willard Straight Hall takeover; organizer and president of The Cornell Daily Sun Alumni Association
Knight Kiplinger (1969) – editor and executive of the Kiplinger publishing empire, including Kiplinger's Personal Finance
Howard A. Rodman (1971) – screenwriter of August and Savage Grace; chair of the Writing Division, USC School of Cinematic Arts

 Dave Ross (1973) – nationally syndicated radio talk show host and news commentator on the CBS Radio Network
Gordon G. Chang (1973) – author on international policy, specifically regarding China, Korea, and nuclear proliferation; Cornell University trustee
Steven A. Carter (1978) – author who coined the term "commitmentphobia", whose book is featured in the films When Harry Met Sally... and The Mexican
Paxus Calta (1979) – anti-nuclear power and clean energy activist; polyamory proponent; resident of Twin Oaks Community; lead campaigner for Friends of the Earth International; board president of Nuclear Information and Resource Service; son of architect Earl Flansburgh; brother of John Flansburgh of They Might Be Giants; allegedly the topic of the song "Boss of Me"; Cornell University trustee
Joey Green (1980) – the "Pantry Professor;" author of books including The Bubble Wrap Book, Marx & Lennon, and Clean It! Fix It! Eat It!; Clio Award winner
Scott Jaschik (1985) – founding editor of Inside Higher Ed; editor of The Chronicle of Higher Education (1999–2003)
Diana Skelton (1986) - author of books including Until the Sky Turns Silver, a finalist in the Next Generation Indie Book Awards (2019)
David Folkenflik (1991) – media correspondent for National Public Radio
 Laurel Braitman (2001) – science historian and writer; TED Fellow

Business

Banking and finance
 Nelson Schaenen (1923) – President of Smith Barney (1964–1967)
 Robert L. Bunting (1955) – President of International Federation of Accountants (2008–2010); Chairman of the American Institute of Certified Public Accountants (2004–2005)
Stephen H. Weiss (1957) – co-founder and CEO of Weiss, Peck & Greer (1970–2001); honorary police commissioner of New York City; Cornell University Board of Trustees Chairman (1989–1997); Cornell University presidential councilor
Thomas W. Jones (1969) – Chairman and CEO of Citigroup's Global Investment Management (1999–2004); President and COO of TIAA-CREF (1993–1997); created the James A. Perkins Prize for Interracial Understanding and Harmony at Cornell University; spokesman for students in the Willard Straight Hall takeover in 1969; Cornell University trustee
Robert Selander (1972) – President and CEO of MasterCard (1997–2010)

Consumer products
 Ray R. Powers (1907) – launched Coca-Cola expansion in Germany in 1929
 Edwin T. Gibson (1908) – Vice President of General Foods; Chairman of the Market Research Corporation of America; founding President of Birdseye Frosted Foods; acting U.S. Defense Production Administrator during the Korean War; Cornell University trustee
 Henry W. Roden (1918) – founding member of the War Advertising Council (now the Ad Council); President of American Home Foods; Chairman of Association of National Advertisers
Adolph Coors III (1937) – President of Adolph Coors Company (1958–1960); kidnapped and murdered by Joseph Corbett, Jr.; brother of Joseph Coors; cousin of Dallas Morse Coors
Joseph Coors (1939) – founding member and financier of the Heritage Foundation; involved with the founding of the Free Congress Foundation and Council for National Policy; member of Reagan's Kitchen Cabinet; President of Adolph Coors Company (1977–1985); brother of Adolph Coors III; cousin of Dallas Morse Coors
 Richard B. Loynd (1950) – President of Eltra Corp. (1971–1982); Chairman of Converse Sneakers (1982–1994); President (1989–1996), CEO (1989–1996), and Chairman (1990–1998) of Interco Inc. (later Furniture Brands International), owners of Thomasville Furniture Industries, Broyhill, and Lane
 Albert E. Suter (1957) – President and COO of Firestone Tire and Rubber Company (1987–1988); President and COO of Whirlpool Corporation (1988–1989); President (1989–1992), COO (1989–1997), Senior Vice Chairman (1992–2001), and Chief Administrative Officer (1997–2001) of Emerson Electric Company
 Charles L. Jarvie (1958) – President of Dr Pepper (1980–1982)
 J. Patrick Mulcahy (1966) – Chairman and CEO of Eveready (1987–2005); co-CEO of Ralston Purina (1997–1999); CEO of Energizer Batteries (2000–2005)
 C. Morton Bishop III (1974) – President of Pendleton Woolen Mills (1999–2018); Cornell University trustee emeritus

Hospitality
Henry B. Williams (1930) – Manager of the Waldorf-Astoria Hotel (1947–1950)
Josh Katzen (1970) – co-founder of the award-winning vegetarian Moosewood Restaurant
Drew Nieporent (1977) – restaurateur; creator and owner of Myriad Restaurant Group, including Nobu, Montrachet, Tribeca Grill, and Rubicon; recognized with numerous awards and nominations from the James Beard Foundation
Andre Balazs (1979) – hotelier and businessman; owner of ten hotels in New York, Miami, and Los Angeles, including the Chateau Marmont
R. Mark Woodworth (1977) – Senior Managing Director CBRE Hotels' Americas Research; founded PKF Hospitality Research with Cornell University's Dr. Jack Corgel in 1999

Manufacturing
 Jasper R. Rand, Jr. (1898) – President of the Rand Drill Company (1900–1905); Vice-President of Ingersoll Rand (1905–1909); namesake of Cornell University's Rand Hall
John Lyon Collyer (1917) – President (1939–1954) and Chairman (1950–1960) of B.F. Goodrich Company; director of rubber for War Production Board; National Rowing Hall of Fame; namesake of Cornell University's Collyer Boathouse; Cornell University Board of Trustees Chairman (1953–1959); Cornell University presidential councilor; Automotive Hall of Fame
 Morse G. Dial (1919) – President and CEO (1952–1958) and Chairman (1958–1963) of Union Carbide
 Birny Mason, Jr. (1931) – President (1960–1966), CEO (1963–1971), and Chairman (1966–1971) of Union Carbide
 Jack Sheinkman (1949) – President of Amalgamated Clothing Workers of America (1987–1995); Chairman of Americans for Democratic Action (1995–1998); leading labor internationalist; Cornell University trustee; Council on Foreign Relations
Peter Busch Orthwein (1968) – co-founder and chairman of Thor Industries; great-great-grandson of Adolphus Busch

Oil
Walter C. Teagle (1900) – President (1917–1937) and Chairman (1937–1942) of Standard Oil; namesake and donor of Cornell University's Teagle Hall; Cornell University trustee
Joseph N. Pew, Jr. (1908) – Vice President (1912–1947) and Chairman (1947–1963) of Sun Oil Company; founder of The Pew Charitable Trusts; namesake of Cornell University's Pew Engineering Quad
 James J. Cosgrove (1909) – General Counsel (1929–1948) and Chairman (1948–1952) of Continental Oil
 H. Laurance Fuller (1960) – President (1983–1995), CEO (1991–1998), and Chairman (1991–2000) of Amoco; Lincoln Center Humanitarian of the Year (1998); Cornell University trustee; Cornell University presidential councilor

Technology
James C. Morgan (1960) – Chairman of Applied Materials (1987–2009); 1996 National Medal of Technology recipient
Jules Kroll (1963) – founder of Kroll Inc. and the modern investigations, intelligence, and security industry; responsible for tracking the assets of Jean-Claude Duvalier, Ferdinand and Imelda Marcos, and Saddam Hussein; corporate member of Council on Foreign Relations and Trilateral Commission; Cornell Entrepreneur of the Year (2003)
Henry A. Klyce (1969) – entrepreneur; developer of orthopedic, neurosurgery, and spinal stenosis devices; founder and executive of multiple medical device companies
Dick Brass (1973) – technology investor, executive, and pioneer; developed first electronic dictionary and thesaurus; responsible for development of ClearType and Open eBook
John H. Foote (1974) – co-founder and Executive Vice-President of TransCore (1995–2005)
Jay Walker (1977) – founder of Priceline.com and Walker Digital
Scott Belsky (2002) – founder of Behance; author of best-selling book Making Ideas Happen, named one of the "100 Most Creative People in Business" by Fast Company
John Zimmer (2006) – co-founder and COO of Lyft

Other
 Paul A. Schoellkopf (1906) – hydroelectric energy magnate; President (1919–1933) and Chairman (1942–1947) of Niagara Falls Power Company and later conglomerates; New York State Council of National Defense; Cornell University trustee (1939–1947); donor of Schoellkopf Field
 Cedric A. Major (1913) – President of the Lehigh Valley Railroad (1947–1961); ranked 11th tennis player nationally in the 1930s competing against Vincent Richards and Bill Tilden
 George P. McNear, Jr. (1913) – President of the Toledo, Peoria and Western Railway (1925–1947) during disputes with labor unions; victim of unsolved murder two weeks after testifying for the House Labor Committee in support of stronger labor restrictions
 Dallas Morse Coors (1940) – founder of the Dallas Morse Coors Foundation for the arts; involved with the founding of the Human Rights Campaign; cousin of Adolph III and Joseph Coors; husband of Sergei Rachmaninoff's granddaughter
 William E. Phillips (1951) – President (1975–1981), Chairman (1981–1989), and CEO (1981–1989) of Ogilvy & Mather; spearheaded Big Apple campaign for New York City
 Ray Handlan (1953) – first president of Atlantic Philanthropic Service Co. (1983–1993), the original U.S. arm of secretive foundation Atlantic Philanthropies; responsible for funding that helped launch and expand City Year; founding member of the International Longevity Center; close associate of Chuck Feeney; Cornell University Director of Development
 Mark A. Belnick (1968) – Chief Corporate Counsel and Executive Vice President of Tyco International (1998–2002); Deputy Chief Counsel of U.S. Senate Iran-Contra Affair Committee; Founder and Director of Cornell Pre-Law Program
 Kenneth C. Brown (1974) – President of Skidmore, Owings & Merrill (1999–2001); Rhodes Scholar; three-time member of U.S. National Rowing team; gold medal at World Rowing Championships (1974)

Education
 Arthur S. Eakle (1892) – founding member and President of the Mineralogical Society of America (1925)
 Glenn W. Herrick (1896) – President of American Association of Economic Entomologists (1915); chairman of the Fourth International Congress of Entomology (1928); zoology and entomology textbook author; cousin of naturalist Anna Botsford Comstock
 Charles H. Rammelkamp (1896) – President of Illinois College (1905–1932); appointed at 31 years old, still one of the youngest college presidents ever in the country
 Porter R. Lee (1903) – social work pioneer and author; Director of the New York School of Social Work (1917–1938); founded the Association of Schools of Social Work
 Warren E. Schutt (1905) – first Rhodes Scholar from New York State and Cornell University; U.S. Consul throughout Europe
 George W. Nasmyth (1906) – sociologist and internationalist; president of the International Federation of Students; director of World Peace Foundation
 George P. Conger (1907) – President of the American Philosophical Association (1944–1945); pioneer of religious naturalism
 John Cranford Adams (1926) – President of Hofstra University (1944–1964); Shakespeare scholar
 Robert P. Ludlum (1930) – President of Blackburn College (1949–1965) and Anne Arundel Community College (1968–1976)
 Edward D. Eddy (1944) – President of University of Rhode Island (1983–1991); Provost of Pennsylvania State University (1977–1983); President of Chatham College (1960–1977); Acting President of the University of New Hampshire (1954–1955); grandson-in-law of Jacob Gould Schurman
 Robert West (1950) – pioneer in silicon chemistry research; discovered first advancing modern glacier
 Eugene N. Feingold (1952) – President of the American Public Health Association (1993–1994)
 Rexford A. Boda (1955) – President of Nyack College (1988–1993)
 Roy Curtiss (1956) – Director of the Center for Infectious Diseases and Vaccinology, Biodesign Institute, Arizona State University; published over 250 scholarly articles; holds multiple patents; United States National Academy of Sciences
Jay O. Light (1963) – Dean of the Harvard Business School (2006–2010)
Harold O. Levy (1974) – New York City School Chancellor (2000–2002) under Mayor Rudy Giuliani; Executive Vice President and General Counsel of Kaplan, Inc.; Director of Global Compliance at Citigroup; Cornell University trustee
Robert Harrison (1976) – CEO of the Clinton Global Initiative and Chairman of the Cornell University Board of Trustees; Rhodes Scholar
Lori L. Altshuler (1978) – Director of the UCLA Mood Disorders Research Program and the UCLA Women's Life Center
Gregory L. Fenves (1979) – University of Texas at Austin president (2015–)
Kimberlé Crenshaw (1981) – prominent scholar and academic; Critical Race Theory movement founder and leader; influential in drafting of the South African Constitution equality clause
Wendy Raymond (1982) - Haverford College president (2019–)

Government, law, and politics

U.S. Congress
Elmer E. Studley (1892) – U.S. Representative (D-NY) (1933–1935); Progressive National Convention delegate (1916)
Maurice Connolly (1897) – U.S. Representative (D-IA) (1913–1915); Chairman of Iowa State Democratic Convention (1914); Democratic National Convention delegate (1916)
Daniel A. Reed (1898) – U.S. Representative (R-NY) (1919–1959); Cornell University football coach (1910–1911)
Norman J. Gould (1899) – U.S. Representative (R-NY) (1915–1923); Republican National Convention delegate (1908, 1916)
Lewis Henry (1909) – U.S. Representative (R-NY) (1922–1923)
Alexander Pirnie (1927) – U.S. Representative (R-NY) (1959–1973); Bronze Star and Legion of Merit recipient
Barber Conable (1943) – U.S. Representative (R-NY) (1965–1984); World Bank President (1986–1991); Council on Foreign Relations; possibly coined the term "smoking gun" when referring to the Watergate scandal
Hansen Clarke (1984) – U.S. Representative (D-MI) (2011–2013); Michigan House of Representatives (1991–1992, 1999–2002); Michigan Senate (2003–2010); first Bangladeshi American to serve in U.S. Congress

U.S. State Department and National Security

Manton M. Wyvell (1901) – private secretary of Secretary of State William Jennings Bryan; U.S. Counsel to International Joint Commission; assistant to U.S. State Department Foreign Trade Adviser; brother-in-law of E.B. White
Roger W. Jones (1928) – Deputy Secretary of State (1961–1962); chairman of the Civil Service Commission (1959–1961); adviser to five U.S. presidents
Stephen Friedman (1959) – Chairman of Goldman Sachs (1990–1994); Director of the National Economic Council (2002–2005); Chairman of the U.S. President's Foreign Intelligence Advisory Board (2006–2009); Council on Foreign Relations; Trilateral Commission
Stephen D. Krasner (1963) – United States Director of Policy Planning (2005–2009); Council on Foreign Relations
Paul Wolfowitz (1965) – United States Director of Policy Planning (1981–1982); United States Deputy Secretary of Defense (2001–2005); World Bank President (2005–2007); Council on Foreign Relations; Trilateral Commission
Sandy Berger (1967) – United States National Security Advisor (1997–2001); Council on Foreign Relations
Robert J. Einhorn (1969) – Assistant Secretary (1999–2001) and Deputy Assistant Secretary (1992–1999) for Nonproliferation in the U.S. State Department; Senior Adviser on Policy Planning Staff (1986–1992); Council on Foreign Relations; husband of Jessica Einhorn
Stephen Hadley (1969) – National Security Advisor (2005–2009)
Robert D. Kyle (1977) – chief international trade counsel to the U.S. Senate Committee on Finance; special assistant to the president for international trade and finance; National Security Council; National Economic Council; Council on Foreign Relations
Makila James (1979) – long-time foreign service officer; U.S. Ambassador to Swaziland (2012–2016)
Dwight Bush (1979) – U.S. Ambassador to Morocco (2014–2017)
Carol R. Kuntz (1984) – Dick Cheney's Homeland Security adviser; hired by Dick Cheney to organize national defense against terrorism in early 2001; assistant to Scooter Libby during Gulf War; Council on Foreign Relations
Elizabeth L. Colagiuri (1992) – Deputy Dean of the College at Princeton University; Executive Director of the Princeton Project on National Security; Special Assistant to the President of the Council on Foreign Relations; Assistant to the Commander in Chief of the U.S. Atlantic Fleet

Other
John F. Murtaugh (1899) – acting Lieutenant Governor of New York (1914); Majority Leader of the New York State Senate (1914); New York State Senate (1911–1914)
Bascom Little (1901) – Chairman of the National Defense Committee of the U.S. Chamber of Commerce during World War I
Morris S. Halliday (1906) – New York State Senate (1915–1918); Tompkins County District Attorney (1909–1914); Hamilton College head football coach (1906)
Daniel B. Strickler (1922) – Lieutenant Governor of Pennsylvania (1947–1951); youngest army officer promoted to captain during World War I; hero of the Battle of the Bulge; member of first American unit to cross the German border during World War II; received the Silver Star with oak leaf cluster, Legion of Merit, Bronze Star, Purple Heart, and Combat Infantryman Badge; advanced to Lieutenant General
Roger O. Egeberg (1924) – General Douglas MacArthur's personal physician; Assistant Secretary of Health in the United States Department of Health and Human Services (1969–1971); proponent for deregulation of marijuana use; Bronze Star, Legion of Merit, and St Olav's medal recipient
Quintino J. Serenati (1934) – Brigadier General; commander of the Malcolm Grow USAF Medical Center; command surgeon for USAF Headquarters Command; recipient of the Legion of Merit and Air Force and Army Commendation Medal
Robert Boochever (1939) – Senior Circuit Judge of United States Court of Appeals for the Ninth Circuit (1986–2011)
DeWest Hooker (1940) – claimed responsibility for John F. Kennedy's presidential election; inspired George Lincoln Rockwell to found the American Nazi Party; oil broker
Lou Conti (1941) – US Marine Corps Major General; President of Marine Corps Reserve Policy Board (1974–1975); Chairman of Reserve Forces Policy Board (1977–1985); Legion of Merit; Distinguished Flying Cross; five Air Medals; Presidential Unit Citation; Navy Unit Commendation; American Defense Service Medal; American Campaign Medal; Asiatic-Pacific Campaign Medal with silver star; World War II Victory Medal; National Defense Service Medal; Korean Service Medal with three bronze stars; Armed Forces Reserve Medal; United Nations Service Medal; Korean Presidential Unit Citation; Korean Service Medal
Robert D. Ladd (1943) – executive secretary to Vice President Richard Nixon; general manager of the Citizens Committee for the second Hoover Commission; son of Carl E. Ladd, Dean of Cornell University College of Agriculture
Gerald Klerman (1950) - head of the Alcohol, Drug Abuse and Mental Health Administration under Jimmy Carter (1977-1980); developed interpersonal psychotherapy as a treatment for depression
John Williams Mellor (1950) – development economist; Wihuri International Prize recipient; International Food Policy Research Institute director-general; USAID chief economist
Philip Merrill (1955) – head of the Export-Import Bank of the United States (2002–2005); donor and namesake of the Philip Merrill College of Journalism; Council on Foreign Relations; donor and namesake of Cornell University's Merrill Presidential Scholars Program; Cornell University trustee; Cornell University presidential councilor
Harry T. Edwards (1962) – United States Court of Appeals for the District of Columbia Circuit Chief Judge (1994–2001); Chairman of Amtrak (1978–1980)
 Eric Mann (1964) – civil rights, anti-war, labor, and environmental organizer; founder and co-chair of the Bus Riders Union
 Alan Sisitsky (1964) – Massachusetts House of Representatives member and Massachusetts Senate Judiciary Committee chairman
Paul L. Friedman (1965) – U.S. District Court for the District of Columbia Judge (1994–2009); Associate Independent Counsel for the Iran-Contra investigation
Ronald E. Nehring (1969) – Utah Supreme Court Justice (2003–2015)
Zachary W. Carter (1972) – corporation counsel of New York City (2014–2019); U.S. Attorney for the Eastern District of New York (1993–1999); first black to lead a Federal prosecutor's office in New York; leader in the 1969 takeover of Willard Straight Hall at Cornell University
Peter S. Knight (1973) – Chief of Staff to Al Gore (1977–1989); Campaign Manager for re-election of Bill Clinton in 1996; President of Generation Investment Management (2004–2017)
John A. Kronstadt (1973) – Los Angeles County Superior Court judge; United States District Court for the Central District of California judge
Leah Ward Sears (1976) – Chief Justice (2005–2009) and Justice (1992–2005) of the Supreme Court of Georgia; first woman, African-American, and youngest person on the Supreme Court of Georgia; first woman to win a contested statewide election in Georgia 
Mary J. Miller (1977) – U.S. Assistant Secretary of the Treasury for Financial Markets (2010 – 2012); Under Secretary of the Treasury for Domestic Finance (2012 - 2014); Acting United States Deputy Secretary of the Treasury (2013 - 2014)
Joseph H. Holland (1978) – New York State Commissioner of Housing & Community Renewal (1995–1996); Cornell University trustee; son of Jerome H. Holland
Bill O'Neill (1978) – New Mexico Senator (2013–present)
Seth Harris (1983) – United States Deputy Secretary of Labor (2009–2014)
Ruben Jose King-Shaw, Jr. (1983) – senior adviser to the Secretary of the Treasury (2003); Deputy Administrator and Chief Operating Officer of the Centers for Medicare and Medicaid Services (2001–2003)
L. Londell McMillan (1987) – entertainment attorney and leading artists' rights advocate; legal representative for Michael Jackson, Spike Lee, Lil' Kim, Prince, Usher, Kanye West, and Stevie Wonder; co-owner of New Jersey Nets; legal affairs manager for Michael Jackson
Gligor A. Tashkovich (1987) – Council on Foreign Relations (1999–2004); Minister of Foreign Investment of the Republic of Macedonia (2006–2008)
Robin S. Rosenbaum (1988) – United States Court of Appeals for the Eleventh Circuit since 2 June 2014.
Alison J. Nathan (1994) – United States District Court for the Southern District of New York; Associate White House Counsel; law clerk to Associate Justice John Paul Stevens on the United States Supreme Court
Uzo Asonye (2002) – Deputy Chief of the Financial Crimes and Public Corruption office at the United States District Court for the Eastern District of Virginia; lead attorney of Paul Manafort's Virginia criminal trial
Nate Shinagawa (2005) – Vice Chair of Tompkins County Legislature; 2012 candidate for U.S. Congress
Svante Myrick (2009) – Mayor of Ithaca, New York (2012–present); one of the youngest mayors in U.S. history
Jacques P. Lerner (1987) - D.C. Office of the Attorney General trial attorney (1994-2012); D.C. Departmemt of For-Hire Vehicles general counsel (2012-2017) and senior policy advisor (2017-2019); Mobility Research Partners LLC founding partner (2019)

Science and engineering
Elias Judah Durand (1893) – mycologist and botanist; foremost expert on discomycetes
Thomas Hall (1893) – inventor of the four-valve steam engine (patents #584,023, #979,002, #1,013,549, #1,050,213)
John B. MacHarg (1893) – inventor of lantern slide mounting apparatus sold to Eastman Kodak (patents #2,153,149, #2,256,399)
 Eads Johnson (1899) – marine engineer, naval architect, and diesel power pioneer with numerous patents
John V. Miller (1899) – brother-in-law and personal aide of Thomas Edison; member of Yale senior society Wolf's Head
Alan MacDonald (1905) – designed the first American concrete ship in 1917–1918
Ralph E. Chapman (1911) – Inventor of underwater welding torch (patents #1,286,227, #1,324,337, #1,687,081)
Oswald C. Brewster (1918) – Manhattan Project engineer
Robley C. Williams (1931) – first President of the Biophysical Society (1958–1960); developed process for coating mirrors by evaporation in a vacuum
Wilbur R. LePage (1933) – electrical engineering pioneer and educator; helped develop the proximity fuze in World War II
LaRoy B. Thompson (1942) – physically assembled the first atomic bomb dropped at Bikini Island in 1946 and made practice run in B-29 bomber
Robert L. Trimpi (1948) – NASA Langley Research Center engineer on Project Mercury, Viking program, Apollo program, and Space Shuttle program; inventor of the wind tunnel capable of simulating atmospheric re-entry conditions for spacecraft
Thomas J. Kelly (1951) – chief engineer of the Apollo Lunar Module; NASA Director of Space Programs (1972–1976)
Peter T. Schurman (1952) – holder of more than 50 patents in plastics machinery and packaging; inventor of the double-wall carrying case; founder of the Plastic Forming Co.; grandson of Jacob Gould Schurman, Cornell University's third president and U.S. Ambassador to China and Germany
Donald P. Greenberg (1955) – visual graphics pioneer; founding director of the National Science Foundation Science and Technology Center for Computer Graphics and Scientific Visualization; Professor of Computer Graphics at Cornell University; recipient of Steven Anson Coons Award
Richard M. Ehrlich (1959) – professor of medicine and physician; president of the Society for Pediatric Urology and American Academy of Pediatrics-Urology Section; photographer
Tyrone D. Taborn (1981) – CEO of Career Communications Group; editor-in-chief and publisher of US Black Engineer & Information Technology; named one of the "50 Most Important African-Americans in Technology" (2002); founder of Black Family Technology Week, La Familia Technology Awareness Week, and the Native American Technology Awareness Project
Regina Clewlow (2001) – founder and Executive Director of Engineers for a Sustainable World

Notable family members
 George C. Boldt, Jr. (1905) – son of George C. Boldt, millionaire and Waldorf-Astoria Hotel proprietor who built Boldt Castle on Heart Island (just over one mile away from Deer Island owned by Yale's Skull and Bones society)
 Robert E. Treman (1909) – Cornell University trustee (1931–1953); member of prominent family of Ithacans, Cornell trustees, and Quill and Dagger members, including father Robert H. Treman (honorary), uncle Charles E. Treman (honorary), brother Allan H. Treman (1921), cousins Arthur B. Treman (1923) and Charles E. Treman, Jr. (1930), nephew Barton Treman (1953), and others; second husband of famous actress Irene Castle
 Leopold Tschirky (1912) – son of Oscar Tschirky, famed Waldorf-Astoria Hotel maître d'hôtel
 George M. Schurman (1913) – son of Jacob Gould Schurman, Cornell University's third president and U.S. Ambassador to China and Germany
 Jacob Gould Schurman, Jr. (1917) – Chief Magistrate of New York City; Cornell University trustee; son of Jacob Gould Schurman, Cornell University's third president and U.S. Ambassador to China and Germany
 A. Buel Trowbridge (1920) – Director of Carnegie Endowment for International Peace Paris office; Rhodes Scholar; father of Alexander Buel Trowbridge III, United States Secretary of Commerce (1967–1968); son of Alexander Buel Trowbridge, dean of Cornell University College of Architecture (1897–1902)
 Harrison Stackhouse Wilson (1935) – son-in-law of Larry E. Gubb; class of 1916, President of Cornell Alumni Association, Cornell Trustee; descendant of James Wilson, creator of the Electoral College
 Benjamin E. Dean (1939) – claims to be the great-great-great-grandson of George Washington through illegitimate son Israel Dean; author of the Virginian in Yankeeland series of books
 Teh-Chang Koo (1940) – son of Wellington Koo, Chinese Minister to the U.S., representative to the Paris Peace Conference of 1919, League of Nations representative; acting President of the Republic of China (1926–1927); grandson of Tang Shaoyi, first Premier of the Republic of China (1912)
 Frank M. Knight (1950) – son of John S. Knight, publisher and Pulitzer Prize winner
 Marco T. Einaudi (1961) – grandson of Luigi Einaudi, first President of the Italian Republic; son of Mario Einaudi, namesake of Cornell University's Center for International Studies
 Ezra Cornell IV (1970) – Cornell University trustee; great-great-great-grandson of Ezra Cornell, founder of Cornell University
 Katherine Cornell (2002) – great-great-great-great-granddaughter of Ezra Cornell, founder of Cornell University

References

Collegiate secret societies